Brohltal is a Verbandsgemeinde ("collective municipality") in the district of Ahrweiler, in Rhineland-Palatinate, Germany. It is situated approximately 30 km north-west of Koblenz. The seat of the municipality is in Niederzissen.

The Verbandsgemeinde Brohltal consists of the following Ortsgemeinden ("local municipalities"):

* seat of the Verbandsgemeinde

References

Verbandsgemeinde in Rhineland-Palatinate